The Fox Armoured Car was a wheeled armoured fighting vehicle produced by Canada in the Second World War.

History 
Built by General Motors, Canada, based on a construction of the British Humber Armoured Car Mk III, adapted to a Canadian Military Pattern truck (CMP) chassis. The turret was manually traversed and fitted with 0.30 and 0.50 in Browning machine guns. The four man crew consisted of the vehicle commander, the driver, a gunner and a wireless operator. 1,506 vehicles were manufactured.

It saw operations in Italy, UK and India. Among its users was Polish 15th Pułk Ułanów Poznańskich ("Poznań Uhlans Regiment"), fighting in Italy in 1943–1944. After the Second World War many of them went to the Portuguese Army, which used them from 1961 to 1975 in counterinsurgency in Angola, Guinea and Mozambique. The Netherlands, faced with a shortage of Humber armoured cars for use in the Dutch East Indies, acquired 39 Foxes, 34 of which were fitted with Humber Mk. IV turrets. The resulting hybrid vehicle, called "Humfox", was immediately successful and popular, and some were passed to the Indonesian Army after independence.

Former operators

Surviving Vehicles
Karl Smith Collection in Tooele, Utah.

Shopland Collection, Clevedon, Somerset, UK.

Robert Gill Collection - www.militarymuseum.at, Vienna
(3 pieces, one displayed in Heeresgeschichtliches Museum, Vienna)

Cavalry Tank Museum, Ahmednagar, Maharashtra, India

See also
Canadian Military Pattern truck
Rhino Heavy Armoured Car

References

External links

Mapleleafup.org
Made in Canada - Canadian Military Pattern vehicles
Humfox photo

World War II armoured cars
World War II armoured fighting vehicles of Canada
Military vehicles introduced from 1940 to 1944